In enzymology, a (S)-carnitine 3-dehydrogenase is an enzyme that catalyzes the chemical reaction

(S)-carnitine + NAD  3-dehydrocarnitine + NADH + H

Thus, the two substrates of this enzyme are (S)-carnitine and NAD, whereas its 3 products are 3-dehydrocarnitine, NADH, and H.

This enzyme belongs to the family of oxidoreductases, specifically those acting on the CH-OH group of donor with NAD or NADP as acceptor. The systematic name of this enzyme class is (S)-carnitine:NAD oxidoreductase.

References

 

EC 1.1.1
NADH-dependent enzymes
Enzymes of unknown structure